Booker T. Washington Senior High School is a normal four year High School located at 1200 NW 6th Avenue in Miami, Florida, United States. It is located in the Overtown neighborhood, and serves families in the Overtown, Downtown, Park West, and Arts & Entertainment District neighborhoods. Its principal is Kevin E. Lawrence.

History
Booker T. Washington Senior High School was originally founded in the area of colored town in August of 1926 as the first high school to host and attend black's with 1,340 students in Miami but was unable to open its doors due to bombings of the school and resulted in a rescheduling for March 27, 1927.  It is the second oldest public high school built for the black residents of Dade County, after George Washington Carver Sr. High and the first one in the City of Miami. The school was started by the St. Paul A.M.E. Church of Coconut Grove.  Students from as far as Palm Beach County came to this school. The school thrived from opening in 1927 as an all-black school up until 1966.

It was converted to a middle school in 1967, to help desegregate the Miami-Dade County Public Schools. A $12 million expansion resulted in construction renovation for the current Booker T. Washington Senior High  which began in 2002 and the school was converted back to a high school as an overcrowding reliever facility for Miami High School and Miami Edison Senior High School in 2002.

As of 2010, the FCAT was terminated from mainstream use and has since been alternated for the Florida End Of course Exam along with English Language Arts and Mathematical assessments.

The school  has a 40-ft. diameter teaching planetarium.

Demographics
Booker T. Washington is 38% Black, 59% Hispanic (of any race), and 3% white non-Hispanic.

Athletics

The Miami Booker T. Washington Tornadoes athletic rivals in Miami are Miami Northwestern Bulls and Miami Central Rockets.

In May 2007 the Tornadoes were  Florida's FHSAA Class 3A State Champions in track and field.

After finishing as runner-up in the 2011 championship game, the Tornadoes won consecutive FHSAA Class 4A Football State Championships in 2012 and 2013.

The coach at the time was head coach Tim Harris. The team was also selected as the 2013 winner of the High School Football National Championship, an honor awarded on rankings from USA Todays National Prep Poll.  The Tornadoes' national championship selection was supported by a 14-0 season that included a 55-0 defeat of the then-national #6 ranked Blue Devils of Norcross, Georgia, followed with a win over the then-national #2 ranked (and Miami-Dade county rival) Miami Central Rockets, 28-17 on September 6, 2013.

In 2014, Tim Harris Jr. assumed the head coaching role. With a 41-0 winning streak the team was awarded a national ranking of #2 in the nation by USA Today's Super25 Rankings. This was supported by a 15-0 season that included a 55-27 defeat of then state champion Oscar F. Smith Tigers of Chesapeake, Virginia and Tucker Knights out of Atlanta, Georgia. Also includes a wins over rival Miami Central Rockets who were ranked #6 in the nation and a O.T thriller with the Bingham Miners of Utah ranked #8 in a state champion bowl series matchup and becoming recognized as the first four time state champion in Dade County.

The school in total has 7 football titles, including 1 National(2013), and 6 State Championships(2007,2012,2013,2014,2015,2019) and 16 consecutive district 8-4A titles.

See also
 List of things named after Booker T. Washington

References

External links

Profile at Miami-Dade County Public Schools
Booker T. Washington's website

Educational institutions established in 1926
High schools in Miami
Miami-Dade County Public Schools high schools
Magnet schools in Florida
1926 establishments in Florida
Historically segregated African-American schools in Florida
Historically black schools